Der Funke was a daily newspaper published from Berlin, Germany, from 1932 to 1933. It was the national organ of the International Socialist Struggle League (ISK). The ISK leader Willi Eichler was the editor-in-chief of Der Funke. It carried the slogan "Der Funke, Daily Paper for Rights, Freedom and Culture". Der Funke argued for a united front against Nazism spanning from bourgeois liberals to communists.

Der Funke was founded in early January 1932. The newspaper was sold by ISK members at streets, coffee shops, bars and cultural events. Its office was located at Insel Strasse. Helmuth von Rauschenplat was the economics editor of the newspaper. Other people working with Der Funke included Grete Henry, Werner Hansen and Gustav Heckmann.

In its 24 June 1932 issue Der Funke published the "Urgent Call for Unity" ahead of the July 1932 Reichstag election. The appeal called for a defence of personal and political freedoms in Germany. The appeal argued for electoral unity between the Social Democratic Party of Germany (SPD) and the Communist Party of Germany (KPD) against Hitler. Signatories of the appeal included Albert Einstein, Käthe Kollwitz, Franz Oppenheimer, Arnold Zweig, Heinrich Mann and Erich Kästner. However, neither SPD nor KPD agreed to the proposal.

The newspaper was banned for four weeks in November and December 1932, following the publication of an editorial labelling president Paul von Hindenburg as the "Protector of Fascism". The newspaper was finally banned in February 1933.

References

External links
Der Funke archive

1932 establishments in Germany
1933 disestablishments in Germany
Defunct newspapers published in Germany
German-language newspapers
Newspapers published in Berlin
Daily newspapers published in Germany
Publications established in 1932
Publications disestablished in 1933
Socialist newspapers